Chersotis andereggii is a moth of the family Noctuidae.

Subspecies
Chersotis andereggii andereggi (Alps)
Chersotis andereggii arcana (southern Finland, northern Estonia)
Chersotis andereggii subtilis (Himalayas (Ladakh))

Description
Chersotis andereggii has a wingspan of 29–32 mm. These relatively small moths are generally greyish-brown, with large dark orbicular and claviform markings. Warren states ab. andereggii Boisd. of R. rectangula  is  darker, without the grey irroration, the lines not showing paler.

Biology
Adults are on wing from the end of July to the first half of August. The larvae feed on Lychnis, Melilotus and Trifolium species.

Distribution
This species can be found in Europe (Bulgaria, East European Russia, Estonia, Finland, France, Greece, Italy, Switzerland), in the southern Urals, Turkey, north-western Iran, Transcaucasia, Turkmenistan, Azerbaijan, Kirghizia, the Altai mountains, the Sayan Mountains, Baikal, Kamchatka, Mongolia, the Himalaya, the Alps.

Habitat
These moths live in alpine meadows and steppe slopes.

Bibliography
 Erstbeschreibung: BOISDUVAL („1834“): Icones historique des lépidoptères d'Europe nouveaux ou peu connus 2: 1-192, pl. 47-84. Paris (Roret). 
 COWAN, C. F. (1970): Boisduval's Icones Historiques des Lépidoptères d'Europe "1832" [-1841]. — Journal of the Society for the Bibliography of Natural History 5 (4): 291-302 
 HUEMER, P. (2013): Die Schmetterlinge Österreichs (Lepidoptera). Systematische und faunistische Checkliste. – 304 S. (Studiohefte 12); Innsbruck (Tiroler Landesmuseen-Betriebsgesellschaft m.b.H.).

References

External links
Noctuinae (Noctuidae) collection of Siberian Zoological Museum
 Lepiforum

Noctuinae
Moths of Europe
Moths of Asia